Varanasi, also called Banaras, is a city in the Indian state of Uttar Pradesh.

Banaras may also refer to:

Places
 Banaras Colony, a neighbourhood of SITE Town, Karachi, Pakistan
 Banaras State
 Banaras Hindu University

Films
 Banaras (2006 film), a Bollywood film
 Banaras (2009 film), a Malayalam film

See also
 Banarasi Babu (disambiguation)
 Bañares, a municipality of La Rioja, Spain